Ceratocystis is a genus of fungi in the family Ceratocystidaceae. Several species are important plant pathogens, causing diseases such as oak wilt and pineapple black rot.

Species

Ceratocystis acericola
Ceratocystis acoma
Ceratocystis adiposa
Ceratocystis aequivaginata
Ceratocystis albida
Ceratocystis albofundus
Ceratocystis angusticoolis
Ceratocystis antennaroidospora
Ceratocystis arborea
Ceratocystis asteroides
Ceratocystis atrox
Ceratocystis autographa
Ceratocystis bhutanensis
Ceratocystis brunneocrinita
Ceratocystis bunae
Ceratocystis buxi
Ceratocystis cacaofunesta
Ceratocystis californica
Ceratocystis capitata
Ceratocystis caryae
Ceratocystis castaneae
Ceratocystis catoniana
Ceratocystis chinaeucensis
Ceratocystis coerulescens
Ceratocystis colombiana
Ceratocystis columnaris
Ceratocystis comata
Ceratocystis concentrica
Ceratocystis conicicollis
Ceratocystis corymbiicola
Ceratocystis crenulata
Ceratocystis curvicollis
Ceratocystis deltoideospora
Ceratocystis denticulata
Ceratocystis dolominuta
Ceratocystis douglasii
Ceratocystis erinaceus
Ceratocystis eucalypti
Ceratocystis eucastaneae
Ceratocystis fagacearum
Ceratocystis fasciata
Ceratocystis ficicola
Ceratocystis filiformis
Ceratocystis fimbriata
Ceratocystis fimbriatomima
Ceratocystis fujiensis
Ceratocystis gossypina
Ceratocystis grandicarpa
Ceratocystis grandifoliae
Ceratocystis horanszkyi
Ceratocystis huliohia
Ceratocystis hyalothecium
Ceratocystis imperfecta
Ceratocystis inquinans
Ceratocystis introcitrina
Ceratocystis ips
Ceratocystis laricicola
Ceratocystis larium
Ceratocystis leptographioides
Ceratocystis leucocarpa
Ceratocystis longispora
Ceratocystis lukuohia
Ceratocystis magnifica
Ceratocystis manginecans
Ceratocystis merolinensis
Ceratocystis microbasis
Ceratocystis microcarpa
Ceratocystis microsperma
Ceratocystis miniata
Ceratocystis minima
Ceratocystis minor
Ceratocystis minuta
Ceratocystis minuta-bicolor
Ceratocystis moniliformis
Ceratocystis moniliformopsis
Ceratocystis montium
Ceratocystis multiannulata
Ceratocystis musarum
Ceratocystis narcissi
Ceratocystis neglecta
Ceratocystis nigra
Ceratocystis nigrocarpa
Ceratocystis norvegica
Ceratocystis nothofagi
Ceratocystis novae-zelandiae
Ceratocystis oblonga
Ceratocystis obpyriformis
Ceratocystis obscura
Ceratocystis ochracea
Ceratocystis olivaceapini
Ceratocystis omanensis
Ceratocystis ossiformis
Ceratocystis pallida
Ceratocystis papillata
Ceratocystis paradoxa
Ceratocystis parva
Ceratocystis piceiperda
Ceratocystis pidoplichikovii
Ceratocystis pilifera
Ceratocystis pinicola
Ceratocystis pirilliformis
Ceratocystis platani
Ceratocystis pluriannulata
Ceratocystis polychroma
Ceratocystis polyconidia
Ceratocystis ponderosae
Ceratocystis populicola
Ceratocystis prolifera
Ceratocystis pseudominor
Ceratocystis pseudonigra
Ceratocystis pseudotsugae
Ceratocystis radicicola
Ceratocystis resinifera
Ceratocystis rostrocylindrica
Ceratocystis rufipennis
Ceratocystis savannae
Ceratocystis schrenkiana
Ceratocystis smalleyi
Ceratocystis spinifera
Ceratocystis spinulosa
Ceratocystis stenoceras
Ceratocystis stenospora
Ceratocystis subannulata
Ceratocystis sumatrana
Ceratocystis tanganyicensis
Ceratocystis tetropii
Ceratocystis torticiliata
Ceratocystis torulosa
Ceratocystis tribiliformis
Ceratocystis truncicola
Ceratocystis tsitsikammensis
Ceratocystis tubicollis
Ceratocystis tyalla
Ceratocystis variospora
Ceratocystis vesca
Ceratocystis virescens
Ceratocystis zombamontana

References

External links
 

Sordariomycetes genera
Microascales